"If It's Cool" is a single by New Zealand hip-hop group, Nesian Mystik released in 2006.The song peaked at no.5 on the RIANZ chart. The song features a sample from The Style Council's "Shout to the Top".

Track listing
"If It's Cool" (Radio Mix)
"If It's Cool" (A Capella)
"If It's Cool"

References

2006 singles
Nesian Mystik songs
2006 songs